This is a list of towns and villages in County Cavan, Ireland. At the 2016 census, the county population was 76,176. Population figures below are for settlements included in the 2016 census.

List of towns and villages by population

See also
List of towns in the Republic of Ireland by population
List of towns and villages in the Republic of Ireland
List of towns and villages in County Cork

References